Dr. Robert Glick is a professor of psychiatry at Columbia University College of Physicians and Surgeons, and  a Supervising and Training Psychoanalyst at the  Columbia University Center for Psychoanalytic Training and Research; he was formerly a director of the Center.

He  graduated summa cum laude from Yale University in 1962, where he was a member of Manuscript Society. He received his medical degree from  Columbia University College of Physicians and Surgeons,  did his internship at the University of Virginia Hospital, Mixed Medical, 1966–1967 and his residency at NYS Psychiatric Institute/New York Presbyterian Hospital, Psychiatry, 1967 - 1970. This was followed by a  fellowship at the   Center For Psychoanalytic Training & Research/Columbia University, Psychoanalytic Medicine, 1969 - 1978. He is Board Certified,  American Board of Psychiatry and Neurology.

Publications
Glick is the  author or editor  of three books on psychiatry, and numerous articles on psychoanalytic training and emergency psychiatry.

Books
Glick, Robert A., and Donald I. Meyers., eds. Masochism: Current Psychoanalytic Perspectives. Hillsdale, NJ: Analytic Press, 1988. 
Roose, Steven P., and Robert A. Glick. Anxiety As Symptom and Signal. Hillsdale, N.J.: Analytic Press, 1995. 
Glick, Robert A., and Steven P. Roose. eds. Rage, Power, and Aggression. New Haven: Yale University Press, 1993. 
Glick, Robert A., and Stanley Bone., eds. Pleasure Beyond the Pleasure Principle. New Haven: Yale University Press, 1990.

Peer-reviewed journal articles
"Acupuncture for the treatment of major depressive disorder: a randomized controlled trial." Andreescu C, Glick RM, Emeremni CA, Houck PR, Mulsant BH.J Clin Psychiatry. 2011 May 3. [Epub ahead of print]  
"The Psychiatric Emergency Research Collaboration-01: methods and results." Boudreaux ED, Allen MH, Claassen C, Currier GW, Bertman L, Glick R, Park J, Feifel D, Camargo CA Jr; PERC. Gen Hosp Psychiatry. 2009 Nov-Dec;31(6):515-22. Epub 2009 Jun 4.  
"Empirical research, psychoanalytic training, and psychoanalytic attitudes." Glick RA, Roose SP. J Am Psychoanal Assoc. 2009 Jun;57(3):657-61. Epub 2009 Jun 15.  
"Writing about clinical theory and psychoanalytic process."  Glick RA, Stern GJ. J Am Psychoanal Assoc.  2008 Dec;56(4):1261-77.  
"Writing as psychoanalytic pedagogy: a primer (the Columbia Psychoanalytic Writing Program)."  Glick RA. J Am Psychoanal Assoc.  2008 Dec;56(4):1227-30.  
"Psychoanalytic education needs to change: what's feasible? Introduction to Wallerstein." Glick RA. J Am Psychoanal Assoc. 2007 Summer;55(3):949-52.
"Talking about medication." Glick RA, Roose SP. J Am Psychoanal Assoc. 2006 Summer;54(3):745-62. 
"Psychoanalytic education and the new analyst."Glick RA. J Am Psychoanal Assoc. 2004 Summer;52(3):829-32. 
"Testing psychodynamic psychotherapy skills among psychiatric residents: the psychodynamic psychotherapy competency test." Mullen LS, Rieder RO, Glick RA, Luber B, Rosen PJ. Am J Psychiatry. 2004 Sep;161(9):1658-64.  
"Comparing cognitive behavior therapy, interpersonal psychotherapy, and psychodynamic psychotherapy." Cutler JL, Goldyne A, Markowitz JC, Devlin MJ, Glick RA. Am J Psychiatry. 2004 Sep;161(9):1567-73.  
"Residency training in emergency psychiatry: a model curriculum developed by the education committee of the American association for emergency psychiatry.Brasch J, Glick RL, Cobb TG, Richmond J. Acad Psychiatry. 2004 Summer;28(2):95-103.  
"Idealization and psychoanalytic learning." Glick RA. Psychoanal Q. 2003 Apr;72(2):377-401. 
"The Columbia Supervision Project: data from the dyad." Cabaniss DL, Glick RA, Roose SP. J Am Psychoanal Assoc. 2001 Winter;49(1):235-67. Erratum in: J Am Psychoanal Assoc 2001 Spring;49(2):728. 
"Mood and anxiety syndromes in emergency psychiatry." Milner KK, Florence T, Glick RL. Psychiatr Clin North Am. 1999 Dec;22(4):755-77. 
"Kandel's challenge to psychoanalysts." Olds DD, Glick RA. Am J Psychiatry.  1999 Apr;156(4):662-3; author reply 665-6. 
"The fate of training cases." Glick R, Eagle P, Luber B, Roose S. Int J Psychoanal. 1996 Aug;77 ( Pt 4):803-12. 
"Treatment of premenstrual dysphoric symptoms in depressed women." Glick R, Harrison W, Endicott J, McGrath P, Quitkin FM. J Am Med Women's Assoc. 1991 Nov-Dec;46(6):182-5. 
"The analyst's postgraduate development--rereading Freud and working theory through." Fogel GI, Glick RA. Psychoanal Q. 1991 Jul;60(3):396-425. 
"Forced terminations." Glick RA. J Am Acad Psychoanal. 1987 Oct;15(4):449-63.
"The use of psychoanalytic concepts in crisis intervention." Glick RA, Meyerson AT. Int J Psychoanal Psychother. 1980-1981;8:171-88.

References

External links
Official website at Columbia

American psychiatrists
Yale University alumni
Columbia University Vagelos College of Physicians and Surgeons alumni
Living people
Year of birth missing (living people)